Nimer Sultany is a Palestinian citizen of Israel, the author of two books on the situation of Palestinian citizens of that country, and a work on constitutional theory and Arab countries. He is a regular contributor to The Guardian and Jadaliyya.

Biography
Sultany was born in Tira. He earned a Master's degree in law at Tel Aviv University. In the early 2000s he was coordinator of the Political Monitoring Project at the Haifa-based Arab Center for Applied Social Research-Mada. After another master's degree in Law from the University of Virginia, he enrolled in Harvard Law School where he obtained a Doctorate in Juridical Science (SJD), the most advanced law degree of its kind. At present he is Reader in Public law at SOAS in London.

In 2017 Oxford University Press published his major theoretical study Law and Revolution: Legitimacy and Constitutionalism After the Arab Spring, which was awarded the inaugural inaugural ICON-S book prize in 2018.

Law and Revolution
Sultany's book is divided into three parts. In each, revolutions are examined in terms of a concept of legitimacy, legality and constitutionalism. His starting point is analyse and challenge Nathan Brown's view that the dominant polity of the Arab world is one of "constitutions without constitutionalism".

Notes

Citations

Sources

Arab citizens of Israel
Harvard University alumni
Living people
Year of birth missing (living people)